Činěves is a municipality and village in Nymburk District in the Central Bohemian Region of the Czech Republic. It has about 500 inhabitants.

Geography
It lies in a flat landscape in the Central Elbe Table.

References

Villages in Nymburk District